Definitive diagnostic data are a specific type of data used in the investigation and diagnosis of IT system problems; transaction performance, fault/error or incorrect output.

Qualification
To qualify as Definitive Diagnostic Data it must be possible to correlate the data with a user's experience of a problem instance, and for that reason they will typically be time stamped event information.  Log and trace records are common sources of Definitive Diagnostic Data.

Statistical data
Generally, statistical data can't be used as it lacks the granularity necessary to directly associate it with a user's experience of a problem instance.  However, it can be adapted by reducing the sample interval to a value approaching the response time of the system transaction being performed.

Further information
 Definitive Diagnostic Data, S. Kendrick, Sharkfest 2014 Conference
 Offord, Paul (2011). RPR: A Problem Diagnosis Method for IT Professionals. Advance Seven Limited. .

Data
Information technology